Euzophera rubricetella is a species of snout moth in the genus Euzophera. It was described by Gottlieb August Wilhelm Herrich-Schäffer in 1856. It is found in Russia and Turkey.

References

Moths described in 1856
Phycitini
Moths of Europe
Moths of Asia